Anna María Agustí Flores (Barcelona, 1 October 1966), known professionally as Nina, is a Spanish singer, vocal coach and actress.

Career
Nina started her music career in the 1980s performing with bands like "Costa Brava" or "Xavier Cugat", backed by Catalan musician Xavier Cugat. In 1987, she rose to fame nationwide in the popular Televisión Española game show Un, dos, tres, where she was cast as one of the "secretaries".

She represented Spain at the Eurovision Song Contest 1989 with the song "Nacida para amar" ("Born to Love") by Juan Carlos Calderón. She finished in sixth place.

Subsequently, she has worked as an actress in several television shows on TV3 and Televisión Española, has also collaborated in radio programmes, and has released records mainly in Catalan language. From 2001 to 2004, she had a prominent role as the "director of the academy" in the first three seasons of the reality talent show series Operación Triunfo; in 2011 she came back as the director of the academy in the eight season of Operación Triunfo, and 2020 she returned as a judge in the eleventh season. In 2018, she participates as a jury and Academy teacher in the Spanish show Pura magia, on its second season.

She has also played in several stage musicals like Las cuatro cartas (1990), Cabaret (1992), Casem-nos una mica (1993), Te odio mi amor (1995), Company (1997), Pierrot Lunaire (1998), Corre, corre Diva (1998), Espai pel somni (1999), Programa Sondheim (2000), the Spanish production of Mamma Mia! (2004–2010, 2015–2017), where she starred as Donna, and Casi normales (2017–2018).

Discography 

Una mujer como yo (1989)
Rompe el tiempo (1990)
Començar de zero (1995)
Corre, corre Diva (1998)
Espai pel somni (2000)
Stephen Sondheim (2001)
Quan somniïs fes-ho en mi (2002)
20 anys i una nit (2005)
Bàsic (2007)
A prop del mar (2011) – with Port Bo.
 Llegendes del cinema (2013) – with La Simfònica de Cobla i Corda de Catalunya.

Notable published works 
 Con voz propia (2016).

References

1966 births
Living people
Spanish women singers
Catalan-language singers
Eurovision Song Contest entrants for Spain
Eurovision Song Contest entrants of 1989
Singers from Barcelona
Actresses from Barcelona
Spanish musical theatre actresses